Resource Hacker (also known as ResHacker or ResHack) is a free resource extraction utility and resource compiler for Windows developed by Angus Johnson. It can be used to add, modify or replace most resources within Windows binaries including strings, images, dialogs, menus, VersionInfo and Manifest resources. It can also create resource files (*.res) from scratch and the latest release provides a number of text templates to facilitate this.

In 2002 the author stated that he had "no plans to continue development". However, since then he has released more updates.

The author also stated that he would neither release nor sell the source code.

On November 19, 2009, version 3.5.2 was released as a beta. This build added support for 64-bit executables and for displaying PNG images.
On September 16, 2011, version 3.6 was released with support for PNG icons.
On May 2, 2015, version 4.0 was released with improved support for 32-bit image files, resources can be started from scratch (with a number of resource templates), and numerous cosmetic improvements.
On August 17, 2015, version 4.2.5 was released. This build added support for changing a text resource format: Unicode, UTF-8, ANSI.
On October 14, 2016, version 4.5.28 was released.
On March 28, 2018, version 4.6.32 was released bringing minor cosmetic updates.
On April 13, 2018, version 4.7.34 was released.
On June 29, 2018, version 5.1.1 was updated.
On January 3, 2019, version 5.1.7 was published.
On November 20, 2020, version 5.1.8 was published, fixing an issues with PNG images not displaying, adding scrolling & zooming of image resources, and fixing a bug with 100MB+ binary resources crashing the hex editor.

References

External links
 Resource Hacker homepage

Programming tools for Windows